John R. Valby (born November 22, 1944) is an American musician, singer, songwriter, comedian, and producer known for his comedic and obscene song parodies. Also known as Dr. Dirty, he typically performs in a white tailcoat suit and black derby hat. His songs and shows focus mainly on sex and racial slurs, with a mix of current and historic people and events.

Early life
Valby was born and raised in Western New York. He attended school in Rochester, New York, where at age seven, was taught to play the piano by two nuns. At ten, Valby wanted to become a performer. In 1966, Valby graduated from Middlebury College in Middlebury, Vermont. At one point he considered a profession as a philosophy teacher, but soon realized it was not right for him and focused on musical entertainment.

Career
Valby joined various rock bands in his early career that "kept on breaking up", which drove him to become a solo piano act of mostly rock and roll and honky tonk tunes. At one show in May 1974, he added some dirty songs of his own into the set. The positive response to the dirty songs led Valby to focus on the more adult material. He would often write new material while transporting between gigs. Valby claimed that he was named "Dr. Dirty" by the National Entertainment Conference, a booking organisation for the college circuit. He stated that he disliked the name because it "takes away from the element of surprise". He credited some of his obscene act as a reaction to the Catholic repression that he faced during childhood.

In addition to his blue comedy act, Valby has recorded and produced pop and rock albums for himself and other artists, including Buffalo Sabres defenseman Jim Schoenfeld, with whom Valby recorded two albums, Schony (1972) and The Key is Love (1974). He also had a small role as a piano player in a Tijuana brothel in the 1983 film Losin' It which featured an early performance by Tom Cruise.

Personal life
Valby is married to his wife Anne; together they have six children. In August 2012 his home in Clarence, New York was burned due to suspected arson. As of 2016, he still lives in Clarence.

Valby endorsed Donald Trump in the 2016 United States presidential election and recorded a song and music video supporting his campaign. (He would later backtrack on his endorsement, working a line into a 2018 song stating that Trump was "full of shit".)

Discography 
1974 – The Key Is Love (collaboration with Jim Schoenfeld)
1974 – Philosophical Bull Shit
1975 – Dirt
1977 – Hotel Buffalo
1978 – Concerto for Piano, Voice and 500 Screaming Assholes
1980 – Lily White And Burnout Blue
1980 – Give Me Dirt or Give Me Death
1982 – Sit on a Happy Face
1982 - Jingle Balls
1982 - Dr. Dirty in Pixieland
1986 - What I Did on My Summer Vacation
1986 - A Sawmill River Christmas
1987 – A Midsummer's Wet Dream
1988 – Don't Go Soft on Me Now
1988 – Beaver Fever
1989 – Your Face or Mine
1989 – Compact DIRT: Digital Ditties
1990 – Fruits of an Idle Mind
1990 – Double Valby: Don't Go Soft on Me Now/Your Face or Mine
1991 - Bootleg Valby
1991 - Dirt the Movie (VHS)
1992 - The Doctor Is In
1992 - Half in the Bag
1992 – Butt Seriously Folks
1992 - Live from Jackinsack New Jersey
1992 – It's a Small Dick After All and Other Short Subjects (live album)
1993 – Double D CD
1994 – Up for Re-Erection
1995 – Scratch N Sniff
1995 - Super Pixies
1995 - 20 Years as Dr. Dirty in America (VHS)
1996 – Fruits of an Idle Mind
1997 – Butt's Up Doc
1998 – Cherry Poppin' in Grand Rapids
1998 – WWW.VALBY.CUM
1998 - Same Shit Different Cover
1999 - Half in the Fuckin' Bag
2000 – Best of Dr Dirty
2000 - The Not Yet On CD, CD*
2000 – Herniated Jingle Balls
2001 – Dr. Dirty's Sphincter Unplugged
2001 – American Troubadour
2001 – Dr. Dirty: O&A and T&A Video
2001 – Greatest Tits
2003 - Operation Fuck Iraq
2003 - Up for Re-Erection
2004 – The Old Fart Cuts Another One
2005 – Valby Rocks
2006 - Treasury of XXXMas Classics
2007 – Coming Soon on a Face Near You
2007 - I'm Here for the Gangbang
2008 – Sheep Thrills
2009 - The Dirt Poems
2009 - Tequila Mockingbird (DVD)
2012 – Tickling the Ovaries
2015 – Survival of the Stiffest
2015 – Keep Calm and Valby On
2016 - Democracy Is Working Again
2018 - Juicy Tidbits

Unknown Years  	
Live at the Pine Inn
Ivy

References

 Richard A. Reuss, An Annotated Field Collection of Songs From the American College Student Oral Tradition (Bloomington: Indiana Univ. Masters Thesis, 1965).
 Ed Cray, The Erotic Muse: American Bawdy Songs (University of Illinois, 1992).

External links 

https://itunes.apple.com/us/artist/john-valby/id59490768

1944 births
American comedy musicians
Middlebury College alumni
Living people
People from Clarence, New York
Comedians from New York (state)
20th-century American pianists
20th-century American comedians
American male pianists
21st-century American pianists
20th-century American male musicians
21st-century American male musicians